Events from the year 1771 in Ireland.

Incumbent
Monarch: George III

Events
 7 August – foundation stone of Clifton House, Belfast, the Belfast Charitable Society's poorhouse, is laid.
 October – Achmet Borumborad, con-artist, opens a Turkish Baths on Bachelor's Quay (modern day Bachelor's Walk), Dublin.
 Archbishop Richard Robinson founds the Armagh Public Library.
 William James of Bailieborough emigrates to the Thirteen Colonies of North America where he will make a great fortune in Albany, New York, and become father of Henry James Sr.

Births
19 July – Thomas Talbot, soldier and politician in Upper Canada (died 1853).
26 October – Juan Mackenna, soldier in Chile (died 1814).
William Homan, only Dunlum Baronet (died 1852).
Edward Jordan, rebel, fisherman and pirate in Nova Scotia (executed 1809).
Edward Kernan, Roman Catholic Bishop of Clogher from 1824 (died 1844).
Philip Nolan, horse-trader and freebooter (killed 1801 in the United States).
Approximate date
Elizabeth Rebecca Edwin née Richards, actress (died 1854).
James Bardin Palmer, land agent, lawyer and politician in Prince Edward Island (died 1833).

Deaths
24 September – Arthur Jones-Nevill, Surveyor General of Ireland and politician (born c.1712).
4 November – Charles Lucas, apothecary, physician and radical politician (born 1713).
25 November – Sir Richard Butler, 5th Baronet, politician (born 1699).
18 December – James O'Brien, politician (born 1701?).

References

 
Years of the 18th century in Ireland
Ireland
1770s in Ireland